Playden is a village and civil parish in the Rother district of East Sussex, England. The village is located one mile (1.6 km) north-west of Rye.

History
Playden is mentioned in the Domesday Book as Pleidena; it is a largely rural parish, having no village centre, and the hamlet of Houghton Green is included in the parish.  Playden's main occupation was fishing: the fish were salted in a one-time settlement known as Saltcote, after the fact that it had a fish salting industry based there. Saltcote Street is now all that remains of that industry.

Governance 
Playden Parish Council has four councillors, and meets monthly at the WI Hall in the village.

The parish is within the Rother District of East Sussex.  In the United Kingdom Parliament, it is part of the Hastings & Rye constituency, represented since the 2019 UK general election by Sally-Ann Hart, of the Conservative party.

Landmarks 
The Norman church is dedicated to St Michael. It was begun in 1190, and contains a ladder to the bell tower dated 1686.

The field in front of the Church formerly known as Beacon Oak Field was the site of a 15th century beacon at Sawcut (sic), sighting from Tenterden and Alomsbridge (about Newington Bridge, Kent, name has disappeared).  The beacon was in the form of a tar filled barrel in an oak tree that was burnt down around 1930 but the stump remains.

The parish includes a two-acre field known as The Butt Field, which since 1703 has been available to the people of the village for "archery practice, recreation and sport".  It is now mainly used for the grazing of sheep.

Within the parish there is a Site of Special Scientific Interest (SSSI), Houghton Green Cliff. This is an exposed cliff face displaying sandstones of geological interest.

In addition, part of the Dungeness, Romney Marsh & Rye SSSI lies within Playden parish.

People 
The artist and scientific illustrator Brian Hargreaves (1935-2011) lived in Playden up until the time of his death.

References

6 A New History of Rye, Leopold Aaron Vidler, 1934

7 A Perambulation of Kent, William Lambarde, 1596

8 The History, Antiquities and Topography of the County of Sussex, Thomas Walker Horsfield, 1825

External links

Villages in East Sussex
Civil parishes in East Sussex
Rother District